Jean-Baptiste Clauzel (born in Lavelanet on 21 September 1746; died in Paris on 2 July 1803) was a French politician. In 1790, he was elected mayor of his hometown.  In 1791, his countrymen sent him sit in the Legislative Assembly where he was very discreet.  In 1792, he was re-elected to the Convention by the department of Ariege he sided on the Mountain.  At the trial of Louis XVI in January 1793, this "royalist" vote the king's death, without suspension ruled against the appeal of the people. He did not vote the impeachment of Jean-Paul Marat while claiming to be "far from approving all the principles of the Revolution espoused by his fanatic friend."   Despite his opposition to the Girondins, he vote by MPs maintenance allowances to Members under arrest. His served as a representative on mission   to the Army of the Pyrenees (West) from the end of August 1793 when he was recalled to Paris. He was among those who organized the downfall of Maximilien Robespierre.  After 9 Thermidor Year II (27 July 1794) he joined the Committee of General Security, and supported the closing of the Jacobin Clubs. An active Thermidorian, he showed a readiness during the insurrection of the 1st Prairial (20 May 1795).  He denounced and arrested the "last Montagnards and called for the arrest of Bertrand Barrere, Jacques Nicolas Billaud-Varenne and Jean-Marie Collot. Returned to the army of the Pyrenees, he found it disgracefully disorganized and unable to fight.

Under the Directory, he was elected to the Council of Ancients and continued to oppose the return of emigres and priests to their former positions.

1746 births
1803 deaths
People from Ariège (department)
Deputies to the French National Convention
Presidents of the National Convention
Représentants en mission
Regicides of Louis XVI
Montagnards
People on the Committee of Public Safety
People of the Reign of Terror
Mayors of places in Occitania (administrative region)